WSU's Performing Arts Center is a performing arts center on the campus of Winona State University in Winona County, Minnesota. The building was built in 1968 and includes a large band room, choir room, a 412-seat proscenium theatre, a versatile black-box theatre (The Dorothy B. Magnus Theatre), a recital hall, dance studio, scene shop, costume shop, make-up and dressing rooms, offices, and classrooms.

The Performing Arts Center houses the Departments of Music, Theatre & Dance, and Communications Studies. It is the summer home and performance location for the Great River Shakespeare Festival.

External links

Winona State University
Performing arts centers in Minnesota
Tourist attractions in Winona County, Minnesota
Buildings and structures in Winona, Minnesota
University and college arts centers in the United States
University and college buildings completed in 1968